Obregonia, the artichoke cactus, is a monotypic genus of cacti, containing the species Obregonia denegrii.  The species is endemic to the state of Tamaulipas in Mexico.

The genus Obregonia is named after Álvaro Obregón, while the species is named after Ramon P. De Negri, who was the Minister of Agriculture of Mexico when the cacti was first described by Alfred Frec in 1923.

Description
This rare species resembles an inverted green pine cone with a woolly center. It grows slowly in culture and requires little water. It benefits from full sun and is multiplied by seed. It is very slow growing.

It is an IUCN Red List Endangered species.

Uses
The Nahuatl Indians call the plant peyotl, and it is said to have hallucinogenic alkaloids. It is one of the closest living relatives of the genus Lophophora.

Gallery

References

  — Database report on species & threats.
 .

External links
 
 Cactiguide.com: Obregonia

Cactoideae genera
Cacti of Mexico
Endemic flora of Mexico
Monotypic Cactaceae genera
Endangered biota of Mexico
Endangered flora of North America